Nogometni Klub Zelina is a Croatian football club based in the town of Sveti Ivan Zelina. Zelina competed in the 4. HNL in the 2018–19 season.

Current squad

Honours

 Treća HNL – West:
Winners (1): 2011–12

External links
NK Zelina official website 
NK Zelina at Nogometni magazin 

Football clubs in Croatia
Football clubs in Zagreb County
Association football clubs established in 1907
1907 establishments in Croatia